Philippe Seydoux (born 23 January 1985) is a Swiss professional ice hockey defenceman currently playing for SC Langenthal in the Swiss League (SL) on loan from fellow SL club, EHC Kloten.

Playing career
Born in Bern, Switzerland, Seydoux played junior with SC Bern from 2000 until 2003. His play attracted the attention of the NHL's Ottawa Senators, who drafted him in the third round (100th overall) in the 2003 NHL Entry Draft. He then moved to EHC Kloten where he played with the Kloten junior team as well as part-time with the professional team. He became a full-time member of the professional team in 2004. In 2006, he moved to HC Fribourg-Gottéron and in 2009 he moved to EHC Biel.

On 29 July 2019, with one-year remaining on his contract in his second stint with EHC Kloten, Seydoux was loaned to fellow league competitors and former club, SC Langenthal, for the duration of the 2019–20 season.

Career statistics

Regular season and playoffs

International

References

External links

1985 births
EHC Biel players
HC Fribourg-Gottéron players
HPK players
EHC Kloten players
Lausanne HC players
Ottawa Senators draft picks
Ice hockey people from Bern
Living people
Ontario Reign (ECHL) players
SC Bern players
SCL Tigers players
SC Langenthal players
Swiss ice hockey defencemen